Eli Dayan (born 25 October 1949) is an Israeli former politician who served as a member of the Knesset for the Alignment and Labor Party between 1988 and 1996, and as Deputy Minister of Foreign Affairs from 1995 until 1996.

Biography
Born in El Kelaa des Sraghna, Morocco in 1949, Dayan made aliyah to Israel in 1963. He studied law at the Hebrew University of Jerusalem, gaining an LLB.

He became mayor of Ashkelon in 1978, a role he held until 1991. He joined the new Tami party in 1981, and was fourth on the party's list for the 1981 Knesset elections, but the party won only three seats. He was third on the list for the 1984 elections, but again failed to win a seat. After Tami merged into Likud, Dayan joined the Labor Party, and in 1988 he was elected to the Knesset on the Alignment list (of which the Labor Party was the major component). He was re-elected in 1992, and was appointed Deputy Minister of Foreign Affairs Minister on 24 July 1995, replacing Yossi Beilin. He held the position until losing his seat in the 1996 elections.

References

External links
 

1949 births
20th-century Moroccan Jews
Moroccan emigrants to Israel
Hebrew University of Jerusalem Faculty of Law alumni
Israeli lawyers
Mayors of places in Israel
People from Ashkelon
Living people
Tami politicians
Alignment (Israel) politicians
Israeli Labor Party politicians
People from El Kelaa des Sraghna
Members of the 12th Knesset (1988–1992)
Members of the 13th Knesset (1992–1996)
Deputy ministers of Israel
Israeli people of Moroccan-Jewish descent